Without Warning (also known as It Came Without Warning) is a 1980 American horror science fiction film directed by Greydon Clark and starring Jack Palance, Martin Landau, Tarah Nutter, and Kevin Peter Hall. Special effects designer Greg Cannom created the aliens for the low-budget film. The film released on September 26, 1980 and was released on home video for the first time on August 5, 2014 through Shout! Factory's Scream Factory label in a Blu-ray/DVD combo pack.

The film is credited with being an inspiration for the 1987 film Predator, both of which star Kevin Peter Hall as a costumed hunter of alien origin.

Dan Grodnik optioned the script in 1978 and hired Bennett Tramer to do a rewrite. Half way through the script, Tramer went to Grodnik and told him he had an epiphany, that he couldn't finish the sci-fi script as he just realized he was a comedy writer. He handed Grodnik the unfinished script with apologies. Grodnik sat down in his living room on an IBM typewriter on top of a TV tray table and finished the script. Shortly thereafter the film went into production. When it was time to list the credits on screen Grodnik asked Tramer if he wanted his credit to read, Bennett Tramer or Ben Tramer. Because Tramer was trying to break into the comedy writing business he felt putting his name on the film wasn't a good idea so he asked to be credited as Ben Nett. Grodnik explained to Tramer, who had no credits at the time, that even the great director Robert Wise, who directed The Sound of Music and West Side Story started off with a horror film entitled The Curse of the Cat People, and that didn't hurt his career but Tramer was adamant that the film credit him as Ben Nett. Tramer went on to write the TV series Saved by the Bell.

Plot
A father and son go hunting in the mountains. Before they can begin hunting, which the son does not want to do anyway, they are killed by flying jellyfish-like creatures, which penetrate their skin with needle-tipped tentacles.

Some time later, four teenagers, Tom, Greg, Beth and Sandy, hike in the same area, ignoring the warnings of local truck stop owner Joe Taylor (Jack Palance). A group of Cub Scouts is also in the area; their leader (Larry Storch) is also killed by the alien creatures, while his troop runs into an unidentified humanoid and flee.

The teenagers set up camp at a lake, but after a few hours, Tom and Beth disappear. Sandy and Greg go looking for them and discover their bodies in an abandoned shack. They drive away in their van, while being attacked by one of the jellyfish which tries to get through the car's windshield. After they get rid of it, they arrive at the truck stop. Greg tries to get help from the locals, but they do not believe him, except for Fred 'Sarge' Dobbs (Martin Landau), who is a mentally ill veteran. Meanwhile, Sandy encounters the humanoid and flees into the woods, where Joe Taylor finds and returns her to Greg.

While they discuss the situation, the sheriff arrives, but Sarge shoots him and begins to become more paranoid. Greg and Sandy leave with Taylor, who reveals he has been attacked by the humanoid before and secretly keeps the flying jellyfish as trophies. They search for the shack and once there, Taylor goes inside to only find the bodies of Tom, Beth and the cub scout leader. They discuss waiting for the creature when Taylor is attacked by another "jellyfish". The young people run once again, leaving him behind as ordered. They stop a police car and get into the back seat, but find Sarge driving. He abducts them, believing them to be aliens. Greg plays along, telling the deranged man that an invasion force is on the way, thus distracting him enough to toss him aside, run away with Sandy and jump from a bridge.

They make it to a house where they find new clothing and try to relax. In the night, Sandy wakes up and goes looking for Greg, only to discover that he has been killed by the alien, who is still in the room. She flees to the basement and the creature is about to get her when Taylor arrives and saves her. On the way to the shack, he tells her about the creature: it is a tall extraterrestrial (Kevin Peter Hall) who hunts humans for sport to keep as trophies, using the living creatures as living weapons against its prey.

They wait at the shack to ambush the hunter with dynamite when Sarge shows up, almost spoiling their plan. He and Taylor fight, and Sandy is about to hit Sarge from behind when the alien arrives and kills Sarge. Taylor then shoots the creature, with little to no effect. Realizing the last chance of success, he lures it to the shack, which is then blown up by Sandy. She alone survives the horrible night.

Cast 

 Tarah Nutter as Sandy
 Christopher S. Nelson as Greg
 Jack Palance as Joe Taylor
 Martin Landau as Fred 'Sarge' Dobbs
 Neville Brand as Leo
 Ralph Meeker as Dave
 Cameron Mitchell as Hunter
 Darby Hinton as Randy
 David Caruso as Tom
 Lynn Theel as Beth
 Sue Ane Langdon as Aggie
 Larry Storch as Cub Scout Leader
 Kevin Peter Hall as The Alien

Release
Without Warning was distributed theatrically by Filmways Pictures. It was shown in Los Angeles on September 19, 1980, and in New York on September 26.

Reception
Tom Buckley of The New York Times wrote: "The big moments, such as they are, in Without Warning have been borrowed from Alien and Invasion of the Body Snatchers. It is the problem of what to do between shots of the super-leeches digging into their victims' necks that has baffled the makers of this wretched film". Dread Central gave the home release of Without Warning 3.5 out of 5, singling out the Blu-ray's special features as a highlight and giving them 4 out of 5. DVD Talk recommended the movie, writing "Without Warning may not be a lost masterpiece but it is a really entertaining low budget horror picture that makes the most of its effects set pieces and a few notable cast members". The A.V. Club praised the performances of veteran actors Martin Landau and Jack Palance and called some of the special effects "damn gross".

References

External links 

 
 

1980 films
American science fiction horror films
American monster movies
1980s science fiction horror films
Films set in the 1970s
1980s monster movies
1980 horror films
Films directed by Greydon Clark
1980s English-language films
1980s American films